Meng Jia, simply known as Jia, is a Chinese singer and actress. She was a member of South Korean girl group Miss A until her contract expired in May 2016. Following the departure, Meng Jia signed with Banana Culture Music in 2016 to pursue her solo activities in China.

Life and career

1990–2009: Early life and career beginnings 
Meng Jia was born on February 3, 1989, as the only child of her family. She attended school in Beijing, where she was recruited by JYP Entertainment in 2007. She later attended Seoul Institute of the Arts.

She was a former member of the project group and Chinese version of the Wonder Girls 'Sisters', but cancelled due to member and trainee changes within their company. In 2009, she appeared in 2PM's "My Color" music video, alongside Fei.

2010–2016: Debut with Miss A and first solo appearances 

In 2010, Jia was chosen as a member of the group Miss A. The 4-member girl group debuted on July 1, 2010.

In 2011, Jia appeared in the music video for M&D's debut single "Close Ur Mouth", and also made several cameo appearances in Dream High and Dream High 2.

In 2012, during Miss A's long hiatus after their promotions for their single "I Don't Need a Man", Jia attended several fashion shows and appeared in a number of fashion magazines. She also performed onstage with singer Ivy during her promotions for the single "I Dance", and participated in Let's Go Dream Team 2's special in Vietnam.

Between 2013 and 2015, she was a presenter on MBC's C-Radio radio show with Fei and Super Junior's Zhou Mi.

She made her acting debut in the 2014 Chinese television series One and a Half Summer alongside 2PM's Nichkhun, and went on to star in the 2015 Chinese film The Third Way of Love, which also featured performances by Song Seung-heon and Liu Yifei.

Jia's last album with Miss A was Colors, released on March 30, 2015. She left Miss A and JYP Entertainment in May 2016 after deciding not to renew her contract with the company.

2016–present: Departure from JYP Entertainment and solo debut 

On June 8, 2016, Jia signed a contract with Banana Culture Music at Andaz Xintiandi in Shanghai to pursue a solo career in her native China.

On November 18, Jia released her first solo single, "Drip". It was followed by "Who's That Girl" on January 3, 2017, which charted at #6 on Billboard China. On April 7, she released "Candy".

On April 8, 2017, Jia won the "Breakthrough Female Artist of the Year" award at the 5th Annual V Chart Awards.

On December 19, she released her fourth single, "Mood", in collaboration with Jackson Wang from Got7.

On March 20, 2018, she returned with her fifth single, "Weapon".

Jia released her sixth single, "Free", on June 4, 2018. Jia announced seventh single "Liwai" on September 2018. 

In 2019, she left Banana Culture Entertainment and continued her solo activities.

In 2020, she and former band mate Fei joined Sisters Who Makes Waves. She debuted as one of the members of X-Sister in the programme.

In January 2021, she released her single, "Glass Wall".

Discography

Extended plays
Jia (2017)

Singles

Promotional singles

OSTs

Albums appearances

Filmography

Film

Drama

Reality shows

Radio

Music videos

Awards and nominations

References

External links

1990 births
Living people
Miss A members
21st-century Chinese actresses
Chinese expatriates in South Korea
Chinese film actresses
Chinese K-pop singers
Chinese Mandopop singers
Chinese television actresses
English-language singers from China
JYP Entertainment artists
Korean-language singers of China
Musicians from Hunan
People from Loudi
21st-century Chinese women singers